The Chapel of the Good Shepherd is a historic Episcopal church designed by architect Frederick Clarke Withers and built in 1888, located at 543 Main Street on Roosevelt Island in Manhattan, New York, United States. It was originally an Episcopal chapel, but is now the Good Shepherd Community Ecumenical Center, used for Episcopal worship services and by other groups.

The chapel was listed on the National Register of Historic Places in 1972, and was restored in 2003.

See also

List of New York City Designated Landmarks in Manhattan on Islands
National Register of Historic Places listings in Manhattan on islands

References
Notes

External links

Church of the Good Shepherd, Roosevelt Island website
History of Chapel of the Good Shepherd

Churches in Manhattan
New York City Designated Landmarks in Manhattan
Good Shepherd
Properties of religious function on the National Register of Historic Places in Manhattan
Churches completed in 1888
19th-century Episcopal church buildings
Roosevelt Island
Churches on the National Register of Historic Places in New York (state)
1888 establishments in New York (state)